The Mission is Captain Jack's first album, released in 1996. It features female singer Liza da Costa. Four singles were released from the album: "Drill Instructor", "Little Boy", "Soldier Soldier", and "Captain Jack".

Track listing

 "The Mission (Intro)" – 1:04
 "Sir Yes Sir (Pt-Mix)" – 4:07
 "Captain Jack (Short Mix)" – 4:06
 "Soldier Soldier (Short Summer Mix)" – 3:34
 "Little Boy (Boy Oh Boy Mix)" – 3:41
 "Drill Instructor (Short Mix)" – 4:12
 "Take On Me (Longplay)" – 5:26 – A-ha cover
 "Captain's Dream (Instrumental Mix)" – 4:02
 "Jack In Da House (Jack Da House Mix)" – 4:10
 "Back Home (Captain's Return)" – 5:16
 "She's A Lady (Sing Nanana Mix)" – 3:14
 "Captain Jack Remix (House Grooves From UK Mix)" – 6:42
 "Drill Instructor Remix (All 4 One Mix)" – 6:13
 "Jack In Da House (Old School Mix)" – 6:09
 "The Final Countdown (Uuh Baby Mix)" – 5:37

Charts

Year-end charts

Certifications

Personnel
Franky Gee — vocals
Liza da Costa — vocals

References

External links
 Allmusic.com
 Discogs.com

1996 debut albums
Captain Jack (band) albums